Jan Bussell was a British racing driver who won the Macau Grand Prix twice, in 1968 and 1971.

In the 1972 Singapore Grand Prix, Jan Bussell escaped a crash where fuel set one of his rear tyres and then his entire car on fire.

References

External links
 

British racing drivers
Possibly living people
Year of birth missing